GameSpy Technology (also known as GameSpy Industries, Inc.), a division of Glu Mobile, was the developer of the GameSpy Technology product, a suite of middleware tools, software, and services for use in the video game industry.

Gamespy Technology was acquired by Glu Mobile in 2012. The company and service were shut down in May 2014 when GameSpy was shut down.

Technology

GameSpy Technology consisted of an array of portable C SDKs that plug into hosted web services that provided the following functionality:
 Game advertising and player matchmaking
 Player and team scores and statistics gathering, arbitration, ranking, rules processing, and leaderboards
 Arbitrary game data storage and retrieval for files to atomic data
 Team, guild, and clan services and management
 NAT Negotiation
 In-game purchases and downloadable content
 Presence, authentication, game invites, and instant messaging
 Player chat rooms
 CD key authentication
 Voice communication
 HTTP, XML, and socket data transport

Supported platforms

 Microsoft Windows
 Mac OS
 PlayStation 2
 PlayStation 3
 PlayStation Portable
 Nintendo Wii
 Nintendo DS
 Nintendo DSi
 Linux
 iPhone

Integrated Technology Partners

Game Engines
Unreal Engine 3

External links 
 GameSpy Technology's Official Site

References

Video game engines
Middleware